Natacha Marro is a maker of shoes and boots.

Natacha grew up in Nice, France before moving to London, England to study at Cordwainers College. After serving a traditional apprenticeship, she opened her first shop in South London in 2000 before entering into a successful partnership in House of Harlot with fellow designer Robin Archer.

Her client list includes David Bowie, Star Wars, Luella, Gwen Stefani, Olivia Newton-John, Goldfrapp and Grayson Perry. Her work has been profiled in newspapers such as The Independent and The Observer.

References

External links
Official site
Interview from National Geographic online

Shoe designers
French fashion designers
French women fashion designers
Living people
Year of birth missing (living people)